Panjin North railway station is a railway station on the Qinhuangdao–Shenyang high-speed railway and Panjin–Yingkou high-speed railway, in the People's Republic of China.

Railway stations in Liaoning
Stations on the Panjin–Yingkou High-Speed Railway
Buildings and structures in Panjin